Six from Sirius is an American comic book mini-series created by Doug Moench and Paul Gulacy and published by Marvel Comics through its Epic Comics imprint in 1984. It was followed by a sequel series in 1985 titled Six from Sirius II.

The plot focuses on six intergalactic agents working for a governmental organization.

Collected editions
The series has been collected into a single volume by Dynamite Entertainment:
 Six from Sirius (128 pages, hardcover, July 2005, softcover, November 2005)

References

1984 comics debuts
1984 comics endings
Comics by Doug Moench
Science fiction comics
Fictional secret agents and spies